The 1999 Connecticut Huskies football team represented the University of Connecticut in the 1999 NCAA Division I-AA football season. This was Connecticut's final season competing at the NCAA Division I-AA level and as member of the Atlantic 10 Conference (A–10), as the program became an NCAA Division I-AA independent the following  year.  Led by Randy Edsall in his first year as head coach, Connecticut finished with season with an overall record of 4–7, tying for sixth place in the A-10 with a conference mark of 3–5.

Schedule

References

Connecticut
UConn Huskies football seasons
Connecticut Huskies football